Željko Franulović defeated Ilie Năstase 6–3, 7–6, 6–1 to win the 1971 South American Open singles competition. Franulović was the defending champion.

Draw

Final

Section 1

Section 2

External links
 1971 ATP Buenos Aires Singles draw

Singles
1971 in Argentine tennis